Tin(II) iodide, also known as stannous iodide, is an ionic tin salt of iodine with the formula SnI2.  It has a formula weight of 372.519 g/mol.  It is a red to red-orange solid.  Its melting point is 320 °C, and its boiling point is 714 °C.

Tin(II) iodide can be synthesised by heating metallic tin with iodine in 2 M hydrochloric acid.

Sn + I2 → SnI2

References

Tin(II) compounds
Iodides
Metal halides
Reducing agents